Rhizobium leguminosarum is a bacterium which lives in a mutualistic symbiotic relationship with legumes, and has the ability to fix free nitrogen from the air. R. leguminosarum has been very thoroughly studied—it has been the subject of more than a thousand publications.

Morphology 
Rhizobium leguminosarum is a Gram-negative, motile, rod-shaped, aerobic bacterium.

Common biovars
Rhizobium leguminosarum biovar trifolii, and R. leguminosarum biovar viciae are the most commonly studied biovars of R. leguminosarum, with certain studies seemingly treating R. trifolii as its own species.

Fatty acid synthesis 
Rhizobium leguminosarums acyl carrier protein differs from most ACPs by having a C-terminus extension. This ACP is also used in the synthesis of unusually long ACPs which themselves are then used in the synthesis of the R. leguminosarum nod factor.

Uses 
R. leguminosarum is widely used in the inoculation of legume seeds. The sv. trifolii strain U204 is commercially used to inoculate white and red clover in particular, but better strains for this purpose are being developed.

Research has been carried out into the role that R. leguminosarum could play in promoting growth of canola and lettuce.

References

External links 
Type strain of Rhizobium leguminosarum at BacDive -  the Bacterial Diversity Metadatabase

Rhizobiaceae